The Abbey Theatre is the Irish national theatre in Dublin.

Abbey Theatre may also refer to:
 Abbey Theatre, Nuneaton, England
 Abbey Theatre School associated with the Abbey Theatre, Dublin
 Abbey's Theatre, 1893–1896 name of the Knickerbocker Theatre (Broadway), 1396 Broadway (West 38th Street),  New York City
 Abbey Theatre, former name of the Classic Stage Company Theatre, 136 East 13th Street, New York City

See also
 Abbey's Park Theatre (1874–1882) 932 Broadway and 22nd Street, New York City.